The twelve national teams involved in the tournament were required to register a squad of 23 players; only players in these squads were eligible to take part in the tournament.

A provisional list of forty players per national team was submitted to CONCACAF by June 2, 2017. The final list of 23 players per national team was submitted to CONCACAF by June 27, 2017. Three players per national team had to be goalkeepers.

National teams that reached the knockout stage were able to swap up to six players in the final squad with six players from the provisional list within 24 hours of their final group stage game.

The statistics in the tables below represent player profiles as of the beginning of the tournament. See individual player articles for current statistics. The club listed is the club for which the player last played a competitive match prior to the tournament. The nationality for each club reflects the national association (not the league) to which the club is affiliated.

Group A

Canada
Head coach:  Octavio Zambrano

Notes

Costa Rica
Head coach: Óscar Ramírez

Rónald Matarrita withdrew from the squad due to injury and was replaced by Juan Pablo Vargas.

Notes

French Guiana
Head coach:  Marie-Rose Carême & Jaïr Karam

Florent Malouda was considered ineligible by CONCACAF.

Honduras
Head coach:  Jorge Luis Pinto

Anthony Lozano and Rony Martínez, although included in the 23-man squad list presented to CONCACAF, did not travel with the squad due to injury.

Notes

Group B

Martinique
Head coach:  Jean-Marc Civault

Nicaragua
Head coach:  Henry Duarte

Panama
Head coach:  Hernán Darío Gómez

United States
Head coach: Bruce Arena

Kenny Saief withdrew from the squad due to injury and was replaced by Chris Pontius.

Notes

Group C

Curaçao
Head coach:  Remko Bicentini

El Salvador
Head coach:  Eduardo Lara

Irvin Herrera withdrew from the squad due to injury and was replaced by Edwin Sánchez.

Jamaica
Head coach: Theodore Whitmore

Dever Orgill withdrew from the squad due to injury and was replaced by Shaun Francis.

Mexico
Head coach:  Luis Pompilio Páez

Alan Pulido withdrew from the squad due to injury and was replaced by Erick Torres.

Player representation

By club

By club nationality

The above table is the same when it comes to league representation, with only the following exceptions:
The English league had nine representatives with the inclusion of one player coming from Wales-based Cardiff City.

Nations or territories in italics were not represented by their national teams in this tournament.

References

CONCACAF Gold Cup squads
2017 CONCACAF Gold Cup